Lambda Doradus (Lambda Dor), Latinized from λ Doradus, is a solitary yellow hued star located in the southern constellation Dorado. It has an apparent magnitude of 5.13, making it faintly visible to the naked eye if viewed under ideal conditions.

Lambda Dor has a stellar classification of either G6 or G8 III, depending on the source. Nevertheless, both indicate that it is a red giant, and it is currently on the red giant branch fusing hydrogen in a shell outside a helium core. Lambda Dor is slightly metal deficient, with an iron abundance 12% below solar levels.

References

G-type giants
Dorado (constellation)
Doradus, Lambda
Doradus, 23
PD-59 00472
036189
025429
1836